Copper peroxide is an inorganic compound with the formula CuO2. It is an oxide of copper(II), with the two oxygen atoms as a peroxide unit. It appears as a dark olive green solid or similarly colored suspension and is unstable, decomposing to dioxygen and other copper oxides.

Preparation
Copper peroxide is prepared by the reaction of cold solutions of Schweizer's reagent—a source of copper(II)—and  hydrogen peroxide, the former prepared from copper(II) hydroxide and dilute ammonia solution. The Schweizer's reagent used must not contain excess ammonia.
Copper peroxide may also be produced by the reaction of an ice-cold solution of hydrogen peroxide with a suspension of copper hydroxide. It may also form from the very slow reaction of finely divided cupric oxide with cold hydrogen peroxide.

Properties
When wet, copper peroxide decomposes at temperatures above 6 °C; it "is far more stable when dry."

References

Peroxides
Copper(II) compounds